Corvallis High School is a public high school located in Corvallis, Montana, United States. It serves grades nine through twelve in the Corvallis Schools district. It had 442 students as of the 20122013 school year. The school's mascot is a Blue Devil.

Athletics and activities
 Speech and debate
 Girls' basketball
 Boys' basketball
 Track
 Cross country
 Girls' soccer
 Boys' soccer
 Cheer
 Tennis
 Golf
 Volleyball
 Football
 Softball
 Wrestling

State championships
 Speech and debate: Drama State Champions 1994, 2003, 2004, 2006, 2007, 2009, 2010, 2012, 2014-2018
 Boys' basketball: 1962
 Girls' track: Class B; 1974, Class A; 2011-2016
 Boys' track: Class B; 1977, Class A; 2009, 2010, 2012, 2015, 2018 
 Girls' cross country: Class A; 2011, 2015
 Boys' cross country: Class A; 2010, 2011, 2015, 2017
 Girls' soccer: Class A; 2003
 Boys' soccer: Class A; 2014, 2015
 Girls' tennis: Class A; 2013, 2014
 Boys' tennis: Class A; 2006, 2010-2012, 2018 (tie)
 Girls' volleyball: Class A; 2013, 2019
 Football: Class B; 1976
 Wrestling: Class B-C; 1996 Class A; 2002 2012

Notable alumni
 Huckleberry "Huck" Seed, professional poker player

References

External links
https://web.archive.org/web/20090303091004/http://corvallis.k12.mt.us/high/

Public high schools in Montana
Schools in Ravalli County, Montana